Lisa Fittko (born Elizabeth Eckstein, ; 1909 – March 12, 2005) helped many escape from  Nazi-occupied France during World War II. The author of two memoirs about wartime Europe, Fittko is also known for her assisting German philosopher and critic Walter Benjamin in getting out of France to escape the Nazis in 1940.

Biography
Lisa Fittko was born into an international Jewish family (Simon, Ekstein) in 1909 in Uzhhorod, Ung County, Kingdom of Hungary. Her large family was active in many spheres of cultural and economic life of the Austro-Hungarian Empire. One branch of her family was active in the Czech national movement, others were prominent industrialists and patrons of the arts. Johann Strauss II, the "Waltz King" was an in-law. She grew up in the company of her aunt Malva Schalek.

After her family moved to Berlin, she witnessed the Nazi rise to power, and became involved in anti-fascist politics. She worked as an underground resistance fighter in Berlin, Prague (where she met her husband and comrade Hans Fittko), Zurich, Amsterdam, Paris, Marseilles and finally, in the Pyrenees where from 1940 to 1941, she escorted refugees into Spain. In Banyuls-sur-mer she was asked by the Socialist mayor, Azéma to assist émigrés in crossing the border, and in creating a network of information so that the "new route would be known by those who came after".  Fittko was an émigré herself wanting to get to Portugal, to be able to take a boat to escape to the U.S. but she remained in Banyuls-sur-mer to participate in Varian Fry's "border project"   (Emergency Rescue Committee) and help many others. Her route became the "new route" and the alternative to the fascist controlled coastal path from Cerbere to Portbou. This same route was called the Lister Route in 1939 (named after the  Spanish Republican general who led his troops out of Spain at the end of the Spanish Civil War) and then later, in 1940 it was coined the F-Route by Fry.

Perhaps the best-known refugee she was able to help was Walter Benjamin, who reached Portbou, Spain, on September 25, 1940. She took Benjamin into Spain following verbal instructions, and a small drawing of the route that mayor Azéma had drawn for her. This was the first of her many walks over the Pyrenees.  Benjamin was found dead in the small hotel in the border town of Port-Bou, where they had arrived on the morning after the Spanish police threatened to turn the small group of émigrés he was with back to occupied France. After Benjamin's death, the rest of his group was subsequently allowed to proceed. According to Fittko, Benjamin carried with him a heavy briefcase which he claimed to be more important than his life. This story was not confirmed by other accounts, causing some controversy. Authorities such as Chimen Abramsky, who was among the first to hear the story and from Fittko herself, give Fittko's account credibility. A briefcase was mentioned in the Spanish police records, but its contents mention only "newspapers and various other papers of unimportant content". Speculations as to its contents have been the subject of scholarly articles and artistic works inspired by Benjamin's story and Lisa Fittko's account of it in her books.

With her husband Hans, she escaped to Cuba, and from there entered the United States. She came to international recognition over forty years later through her two widely translated memoirs, in which she describes her actions.

She died in Chicago at the age of 95 on March 12, 2005.

Selected works 
 Lisa Fittko, Escape through the Pyrenees, Northwestern University Press, .
 Lisa Fittko, Solidarity and Treason: Resistance and Exile, 1933-1940, translated by Roselyn Theobald in collaboration with the author Evanston, Illinois, Northwestern University Press, 1993

References

Further reading
 Siglinde Bolbecher; Konstantin Kaiser (Hg.): Lisa Fittko. In: Lexikon der österreichischen Exilliteratur. Deuticke Verlagsgesellschaft, Wien & München 2000,

External links 
 Biographical essay by Catherine Stodolsky
 "In Memoriam: Lisa Fittko, Holocaust Rescue Activist", by Rafael Medoff
 Page dedicated to Lisa Fittko at the Varian Fry Institute
 On Lisa's passage with Walter Benjamin 
 Lisa Fittko on the Women Living with War website
 Interview with Lisa Fittko on YouTube (8 hours total) created by the USC Shoah Foundation

Concerning the Controversy about Walter Benjamin's briefcase"
 Chimen Abramsky in the London Review of Books

1909 births
2005 deaths
People from Uzhhorod
Ukrainian Jews
Hungarian emigrants to the United States
American people of Ukrainian-Jewish descent
Female resistance members of World War II
Jews in the French resistance
Jewish women